Cornufer nakanaiorum is a species of frog in the family Ceratobatrachidae endemic to montane rainforests in the Nakanai Mountains on New Britain Island, Papua New Guinea.

The adult frog measures 34.2 to 35.8 mm in snout-vent length.

References

Amphibians described in 2006
Endemic fauna of Papua New Guinea
nakanaiorum